Deraz Ab-e Sofla (also Romanized as Derāz Āb-e Soflá; also known as Derāz Āb-e Pā’īn) is a village in Bagh-e Keshmir Rural District, Salehabad County, Razavi Khorasan Province, Iran. At the 2006 census, its population was 948, in 213 families.

References 

Populated places in   Torbat-e Jam County